Phoenissa is a geometer moth genus in the subfamily Larentiinae.

The species in this genus are:
 Phoenissa brephos (Oberthür, 1884)
 Phoenissa ischna (Prout, 1938)
 Phoenissa lamae (Alphéraky, 1897)
 Phoenissa leucophoca (Prout, 1938)
 Phoenissa uber (Prout, 1938)

References
Natural History Museum Lepidoptera genus database

Geometridae